Mouth to Mouth is a 2009 comedy-drama television series written by Karl Minns and broadcast on BBC Three. A successful pilot episode of the programme had been broadcast in 2008, starring the same female cast as the full series but no males and with a significantly different story. Each of the six episodes follows a monologue structure (with brief comments from other characters) in which each of the main characters describes their life around the same date. As the series progresses, the viewer discovers how the lives are interwoven. On the surface the script has some fine humorous moments but underlying it deals with some serious issues.

Cast
 Anna Nightingale as Meeshell Reeves
 Alex Price as Tyler Cooke
 Simon Coombs as Luke Sobers 
 Ayesha Antoineas Devine Bello
 Shane Zaza as Rakim Prateek
 Pippa Duffy as Faith

Episodes

Reception
Tim Dowling of The Guardian said of the first episode that the "monologue format is a bit stilted but the writing is sharp and at times very funny". Joe Clay in The Times called it "brave thought provoking telly that is also very funny". Matt Bayliss in The Daily Express thought the series "a modern fairy tale that managed to be both original and still actually work". The Radio Times was also a fan, calling it "beautifully written and splendidly acted...a treat of the kind seldom found on BBC3".

References

External links
 

2009 British television series debuts
BBC Television shows
British comedy-drama television shows
2000s British comedy-drama television series
2009 British television series endings